Man, Woman and Child is a 1983 American drama film directed by Dick Richards and written by Erich Segal and David Zelag Goodman. It is based on Erich Segal's  book of the same name. The film stars Martin Sheen, Blythe Danner, Craig T. Nelson, David Hemmings, Nathalie Nell and Maureen Anderman. The film was released on April 1, 1983, by Paramount Pictures. The Bollywood film Masoom is an unauthorised remake of Man, Woman and Child.

Plot
Martin Sheen is Robert, the man - a sensitive, intelligent family man who, in one brief and innocent affair long past, fathered a child whose sudden appearance threatens his happy life. Blythe Danner is Sheila, the woman - a strong loving wife and mother whose deep love and commitment are stretched to the breaking point by the unexpected arrival of her husband's illegitimate son. Crafted in the tender tradition of Love Story, what follows is an evocative, emotionally-charged movie about a typical American family whose deep love is shaken, tested and ultimately reaffirmed.

Cast 
Martin Sheen as Robert Beckwith
Blythe Danner as Sheila Beckwith
Craig T. Nelson as Bernie Ackerman
David Hemmings as Gavin Wilson
Nathalie Nell as Nicole Guerin
Maureen Anderman as Margo
Sebastian Dungan as Jean-Claude Guerin
Arlene McIntyre as Jessica Beckwith
Melissa Francis as	Paula Beckwith 
Billy Jayne as Davey Ackerman 
Ruth Silveira as Nancy Ackerman
Jacques François as Louis

Reception
The film opened to number 13 in its first weekend, with $802,702.

References

External links 
 
 

1983 films
1983 drama films
Adultery in films
American drama films
1980s English-language films
Films scored by Georges Delerue
Films based on American novels
Films directed by Dick Richards
Paramount Pictures films
1980s American films